The following is a list of state highways in the U.S. state of Louisiana designated in the 500-549 range.


Louisiana Highway 500

Louisiana Highway 500 (LA 500) runs  in an east–west direction from US 167 at Packton, Grant Parish to US 84 west of Jena, LaSalle Parish.

LA 500 initially travels due east from US 167 along the Grant–Winn parish line.  It then curves southeast through the Kisatchie National Forest and proceeds into the village of Georgetown.  Here, the highway crosses the four-lane US 165 and zigzags north and east through the center of town.  Heading southeast from Georgetown, LA 500 crosses the Little River in LaSalle Parish.  The route continues through the tiny rural communities of Zenoria, Little Creek, and Searcy until reaching its eastern terminus at a T-intersection with US 84 west of Trout, an unincorporated community outside Jena.  LA 500 is an undivided two-lane highway for its entire route.

Louisiana Highway 501

Louisiana Highway 502

Louisiana Highway 502 (LA 502) runs  in a north–south direction from US 165 to LA 500 in Georgetown, Grant Parish.

The route heads due east from US 165 then turns northward after crossing the Union Pacific Railroad (UPRR) tracks.  Now running parallel to US 165, LA 502 enters Georgetown and intersects LA 500.  The north–south section of the route represents the original alignment of US 165 in the area.  It is an undivided two-lane highway for its entire length.

Louisiana Highway 503

Louisiana Highway 504

Louisiana Highway 505

Louisiana Highway 505 (LA 505) runs  in a north–south direction from US 167 at Tannehill, Winn Parish to LA 4 in Weston, Jackson Parish.

The route is roughly L-shaped, initially heading northwest from US 167.  It then curves to the northeast, passing between the towns of Jonesboro and Dodson as it crosses US 167 at Wyatt.  LA 505 continues northeast to an intersection with LA 4 in Weston.  It is an undivided two-lane highway for its entire length.

Louisiana Highway 506

Louisiana Highway 506 runs in a general Northwest - Southeast direction from LA-124 in LaSalle Parish, to Hebron Rd in Caldwell Parish.

Beginning at its Southeastern terminus at LA-124, LA-506 runs 4.3 miles in a northern direction to the southern terminus of LA-849 east of Kelly. It then continues west for 3 miles, where it crosses U.S. Highway 165, then continues west approximately 10 miles. Its Northern terminus is at a point where State maintenance ends and the road becomes gravel.

Except for the 1 mile section between its intersection with LA-843 to its intersection with US-165, the entire route is scheduled for deletion as part of Louisiana's "Right Sizing" program.

Louisiana Highway 507

Louisiana Highway 508

Louisiana Highway 509

Louisiana Highway 510

Louisiana Highway 511

Louisiana Highway 511 (LA 511) runs  in an east–west direction from the concurrent US 79/US 80 in Greenwood, Caddo Parish to US 71 in Bossier City, Bossier Parish.

Louisiana Highway 512

Louisiana Highway 513

Louisiana Highway 514

Louisiana Highway 515

Louisiana Highway 516

Louisiana Highway 517

Louisiana Highway 518

Louisiana Highway 519

Louisiana Highway 520

Louisiana Highway 520 (LA 520) runs  in a north–south direction from US 79 in Homer to LA 161 northeast of Gordon, Claiborne Parish.

The route heads in a general northeast direction from an intersection with US 79 at the northern tip of Homer.  It makes a brief jog eastward onto LA 2 Alternate at Colquitt before turning north toward LA 161 just south of the Arkansas state line.  It is an undivided two-lane highway for its entire length.

Louisiana Highway 521

Louisiana Highway 522

Louisiana Highway 523

Louisiana Highway 523 (LA 523) runs  in a southeast to northwest direction from LA 1 to LA 511 in Shreveport, Caddo Parish.

The route heads west from LA 1 at Lucas, a point within the southeast corner of Shreveport.  After intersecting LA 3132 (Inner Loop Expressway), LA 523 curves to the southwest then turns northwest.  The highway follows Ellerbe Road across LA 516 (East Bert Kouns Industrial Loop) to a second interchange with LA 3132 just east of I-49.  LA 523 proceeds northward onto Line Avenue to its terminus at LA 511 in an area of Shreveport known as Cedar Grove.

Louisiana Highway 524

Louisiana Highway 524 (LA 524) runs  in a north–south direction from US 165 north of Pollock to the end of state maintenance at a point just north of LA 123 in Breezy Hill, Grant Parish.

The route parallels US 165 through the community of Antonia.  It then makes a brief jog onto US 165 before crossing to the west side of the highway and continuing toward Breezy Hill, where it continues as a local road.  LA 524 represents the original alignment of US 165 through the area.  It is an undivided two-lane highway for its entire length.

Louisiana Highway 525

Louisiana Highway 526

Known as the Bert Kouns Industrial Loop, Louisiana 526 provides a southern bypass around Shreveport, connecting with Louisiana Highway 1 and US 71 eastbound, and US 171 and Interstate 20 westbound. It intersects Interstate 49 seven miles south of Interstate 20.

Louisiana Highway 527

Louisiana Highway 527 (LA 527) runs  in an east–west direction from US 71 at Taylortown, Bossier Parish to LA 163 south of Lake Bistineau State Park in Webster Parish.

Louisiana Highway 528

Louisiana Highway 529

Louisiana Highway 530

Louisiana Highway 531

Louisiana Highway 532

Louisiana Highway 533

Louisiana Highway 534

Louisiana Highway 537

Louisiana Highway 538

Louisiana Highway 538 (LA 538) runs  in a north–south direction from LA 3049 in Shreveport to LA 1 north of Oil City, Caddo Parish.

The route begins at an intersection with LA 3049 in Shreveport, just south of I-220. LA 3049 continues the route south on Grimmett Drive and makes a right to the north on Dixie Shreveport Road. From this intersection, LA 538 heads north on Old Mooringsport Road, retaining this name until halfway through Mooringsport. It crosses under I-220, and shortly after, it has an intersection with Ravendale Drive at a traffic circle. LA 538 continues north for 2.8 miles (4.5 km) before making a brief jog onto US 71. After crossing out of the Shreveport city limits, LA 538 begins a northwest course for 2.5 mi (4.0 km), crossing a bridge over I-49 before curving to the southwest and intersecting with LA 1, where it turns northwest and then to the west, before curving back to the northwest shortly after passing a high school. LA 538 continues northwest for 2.7 mi (4.3 km) before intersecting LA 173. LA 173 heads north to a point known as Dixie, also intersecting LA 1. Shortly, after, LA 538 curves to the north-northwest, crossing under the Kansas City Southern Railway tracks. After 4.1 mi (6.6 km), LA 538 enters the town of Mooringsport, and shortly after it intersects with LA 169, which heads northeast to just northwest of Dixie. From here, LA 538 curves to the west and then to the north, where Old Mooringsport Road ends and LA 538 gains the local name of Latimer Street. Shortly after, LA 538 curves to the northeast and then to the north as it crosses a bridge over Caddo Lake. LA 538 parallels the Caddo Lake Historic Drawbridge while on this bridge. LA 538 also begins to parallel the Kansas City Southern Railway tracks before splitting from the railway as the highway curves to the northeast and then to the northwest, before intersecting with LA 1 a second time. After 1.3 mi (2.0 km), LA 538 enters the town of Oil City, gaining the local name of Kerley Avenue. Shortly after entering town, LA 538 intersects LA 530 (Allen Street). LA 538 and LA 530 begin a concurrency for 1.1 mi (1.8 km) until LA 530 splits off to the east toward the village of Belcher. LA 538 continues north for a final 2.2 mi (3.5 km) before reaching its northern terminus at a third intersection with LA 1, just north of Oil City. LA 538 is an undivided two-lane highway except for the traffic circle at Ravendale Drive.

Louisiana Highway 540

Louisiana Highway 541

Louisiana Highway 541 (LA 541) runs  in a general east–west direction from LA 18 in Avondale to a second junction with LA 18 in Harvey, Jefferson Parish.

The route heads north on River Road from LA 18 through the community of Bridge City, where it begins to parallel the west bank levee of the Mississippi River.  After crossing underneath the Huey P. Long Bridge on US 90, LA 541 follows a sharp bend in the river known as Nine Mile Point.  Now heading south, the highway enters the city of Westwego and has a brief concurrency with LA 18.  Its local name briefly changes to Labauve Drive within the city limits.  Continuing eastward along the river, LA 541 crosses into Marrero and intersects LA 560-2 (Barataria Boulevard), a short connector to LA 18 and LA 45.  After crossing from Marrero into another unincorporated community known as Harvey, LA 541 curves south onto Destrehan Avenue alongside the Harvey Canal, a link in the Gulf Intracoastal Waterway.  The route ends shortly afterward at LA 18 (4th Street) adjacent to a bascule bridge spanning the canal on that highway.  LA 541 is an undivided two-lane highway for its entire length.

Louisiana Highway 542

Louisiana Highway 543

Louisiana Highway 544

Louisiana Highway 545

Louisiana Highway 546

Louisiana Highway 546 (LA 546) runs  in a southwest to northeast direction from LA 34 northeast of Eros to a junction with US 80 and LA 15 west of Monroe, Ouachita Parish.

The route heads northeast from LA 34 and intersects LA 151 at Cadeville where it passes West Ouachita High School.  Near the end of its route, LA 546 crosses the Kansas City Southern Railway (KCSRW) tracks via an overpass and travels through an interchange with I-20 in Cheniere.  It ends a short distance later at an intersection with US 80 and southbound LA 15, connecting to West Monroe.  Northbound LA 15 continues straight ahead toward Farmerville.  LA 546 is an undivided two-lane highway for its entire length.

Louisiana Highway 547
Louisiana Highway 547 runs 3.06 miles in an East-West direction from a local road to its Western terminus at LA-845 in Clarks.

The entire route is in Caldwell Parish.

As part of Louisiana DOTD's "right-sizing" program, the entire route is set to be deleted and transferred to local control.

Louisiana Highway 548

Louisiana Highway 549

Louisiana Highway 549 (LA 549) runs  in a north–south direction from LA 15 north of Farmerville to the Arkansas state line north of Oakland, Union Parish.

The route heads north from LA 15 and intersects LA 348 at Conway.  LA 549 then passes the Union Wildlife Management Area and curves to the northeast at Truxno.  Shortly before crossing the Arkansas state line, LA 549 intersects LA 551 in Oakland.  The road continues toward Strong, Arkansas and US 82 as Arkansas Highway 275.  It is an undivided two-lane highway for its entire length.

References

External links
La DOTD State, District, and Parish Maps